Sphagnum affine, the imbricate bogmoss, is a species of peat moss or sphagnum moss which is exploited to make commercial peat products. This moss has a yellowish coloring.

References

affine